{{Speciesbox
| name = Speckled flounder
| image = Limanda punctatissima.jpg
| taxon =Limanda punctatissima| authority = (Steindachner, 1879)
| synonyms = *Hippoglossoides punctatissimus Steindachner, 1879 Pleuronectes punctatissimus (Steindachner, 1879)Limanda iridorum Jordan & Starks, 1906  
}}

The speckled flounder (Limanda punctatissima'') is a flatfish of the family Pleuronectidae. It is a demersal fish that lives on bottoms in the temperate waters of the northwestern Pacific, from the southern Sea of Okhotsk and the Kuril islands to the Sea of Japan, including coastal areas of Japan and Korea.

References

speckled flounder
Kuril Islands
Sea of Japan
Taxa named by Franz Steindachner
speckled flounder